This is a list of states in the Holy Roman Empire beginning with the letter U:

References

U